Iva Majoli (born 12 August 1977) is a former professional tennis player from Croatia who played for both Yugoslavia and Croatia. She upset Martina Hingis to win the women's singles title at the French Open in 1997. Majoli also won seven other singles titles and one doubles title during her career. She reached a career-high singles ranking of world No. 4, in February 1996.

Career
Majoli was born in Zagreb in SR Croatia, Yugoslavia. As a girl, she was trained by Jelena Genčić. Iva turned professional in September 1990 at the age of 13 when she played her first professional match in Makarska, representing Yugoslavia, losing in the first round to Ruxandra Dragomir. Aged 19, she won the 1997 French Open singles title, defeating Sandra Kleinová, Alexandra Fusai, Ann Grossman, Lindsay Davenport, Ruxandra Dragomir and Amanda Coetzer before beating the 16-year-old Martina Hingis in straight sets, 6–4, 6–2. Majoli played aggressively from the baseline to end Hingis's 37-match winning streak and hand her opponent her first defeat in a final of a Grand Slam.

Majoli played her best tennis as a teenager, reaching her career high ranking of world No. 4 in 1996.  After a quarterfinal appearance at the 1998 French Open, she failed to reach the fourth round of any subsequent Grand Slam singles tournament. In 2002, ranked world No. 58, Majoli defeated Patty Schnyder, in the final of the Family Circle Cup in Charleston, South Carolina. The victory increased Majoli's ranking to world No. 33, but her game steadily declined thereafter, with her ranking plummeting to No. 131 in 2003. In the final years of her tennis career, Majoli suffered from a series of injuries – most notably a shoulder injury – and struggled to play consistently. On June 12, 2004, she announced her retirement from the game.

In 2006, she announced that she was engaged and pregnant with her first child. She married a local businessman, Stipe Marić, on 9 September 2006, with Jennifer Capriati and Mary Pierce attending the wedding. She gave birth to her daughter Mia on 31 October 2006. Majoli and Marić divorced in 2012. Majoli married Roberto Callegari in 2022.

In 2007, Majoli participated in the second season of the Croatian version of Dancing with the Stars. Her partner was Marko Herceg. She was eliminated in the fourth episode.

In 2012, she was selected to be the non-playing captain of the Croatian Fed Cup team.

Majoli made a comeback in professional tennis at the 2015 Kremlin Cup, where she received a wildcard with Anastasia Bukhanko in the doubles draw.

Significant finals

Grand Slam finals

Singles: 1 (title)

Tier I finals

Singles: 3 (3 titles)

WTA career finals

Singles: 17 (8 titles, 9 runner-ups)

Doubles: 5 (1 title, 4 runner-ups)

ITF finals

Singles (2–4)

Doubles (0–1)

Grand Slam singles performance timeline

References

External links

 
 
 
 Majoli announces retirement 
 More about her French Open Win

1977 births
Living people
Croatian female tennis players
French Open champions
Olympic tennis players of Croatia
Tennis players from Zagreb
Tennis players at the 1996 Summer Olympics
Tennis players at the 2000 Summer Olympics
Hopman Cup competitors
Grand Slam (tennis) champions in women's singles